The First, also called The First TV and stylized as The F1rst, is a conservative opinion and commentary network in the United States started in October 2019. It has five hosts; including Bill O'Reilly.

History 
The First was launched in October 2019 on Pluto TV, a streaming platform owned by Paramount Global. It was started in partnership with Red Seat Ventures. It offers about 45 hours of original programming a week. In January 2023, The First was added to DirecTV, after it concurrently dropped Newsmax TV due to demands for carriage fees.

Hosts 
The First launched with two hosts in October 2019, former combat veteran Jesse Kelly and former CIA analyst Buck Sexton. In January 2020, the network added California-based talk radio host Mike Slater and conservative female talk radio host Dana Loesch. On June 1, 2020, the network announced that Bill O'Reilly was joining the network with his show No Spin News. He began the online show in 2017 after being fired from Fox News Channel, in the wake of The New York Times publishing details of six sexual misconduct lawsuits O'Reilly had settled.

Reception
Tyler Hersko of IndieWire criticized ViacomCBS for their involvement in O'Reilly's show, commenting that its Pluto TV debut coincided with the date that its entertainment and youth channels were made unavailable for eight minutes 46 seconds in solidarity with Black Lives Matter. Hersko found this hypocritical in light of comments made by O'Reilly about African-Americans. A petition by ViacomCBS employees urged the company to remove The First for similar reasons.

References

External links
Official website
App Download
https://rumble.com/vjmjz7-the-first-tv-live.html Rumble Stream]

Conservative media in the United States
2019 establishments in the United States
Bill O'Reilly (political commentator)
Streaming media systems